Kevin MacTaggert, best known as Proteus and also called Mutant X, is a character appearing in American comic books published by Marvel Comics. The character is commonly associated with the X-Men.

Kevin was the mutant son of Scottish genetic researcher Moira MacTaggert and politician Joseph MacTaggert. Kevin had reality-warping and possession powers and lived most of his life in forced seclusion at his mother's Muir Island research facility.

His attempt to break free and find his father made up a classic 1979–80 The Uncanny X-Men storyline that was adapted in the 1990s X-Men animated series. In 2009, Proteus was ranked as IGN's 77th-greatest villain of all time.

Publication history
Created by writer Chris Claremont and artist/co-writer John Byrne, Proteus first appeared in The Uncanny X-Men #125 (September 1979), though hints to his character appeared in earlier issues. First, he appears off-panel in The Uncanny X-Men #104. His voice is then revealed in The Uncanny X-Men #119, as he took over the body of his first victim off-panel.

Fictional character biography
Proteus is written as one of the strongest and deadliest mutants ever to appear in Marvel Comics. Despite this, Proteus was not fortunate enough to have a happy life. Even his conception was under unpleasant circumstances. He was the son of Moira MacTaggert and her sinister husband, Joseph MacTaggert, who forced Moira into an unhappy marriage. Moira conceived Kevin after Joseph severely beat and raped her. After this traumatic experience, Moira left Joseph. She did not notify him that she was pregnant with his child.

Moira and Kevin lived at her Mutant Research Centre on Muir Island, off the coast of Scotland. Kevin eventually began manifesting his mutant abilities and became a danger to everyone around him. His abilities gave him an uncontrollable hunger for energy. To protect herself and others, Moira was forced to confine Kevin. To keep the truth about her son secret, she began to describe him to others only as Mutant X.

For years, Kevin remained inside his cell, sustained by esoteric energy fields that kept his body from burning itself out, until one day, after a battle between Magneto and the X-Men, his cell was damaged and Kevin was able to escape when he took over the body of Angus MacWhirter.

Mutant X realized that this stolen body was less effective than his original skin at housing his energy form. Reasoning that a more powerful host might sustain him for longer, Kevin decided to possess another resident of Muir Island, the powerful mutant known as Phoenix. He stalked Jean Grey for several days in Angus MacWhirter's body, looking for the opportunity to grab her while she was alone. Significantly weakened by the time his opportunity came, Mutant X was unable to overcome the Phoenix, and was driven off by her psychic assault. Without the isosteric energy fields of his cell to sustain him, Kevin began to burn his body out. The only solution he could find was to possess human host bodies, one after another. He went after Polaris next, but ultimately ended up taking the body of her protector, one of Madrox's duplicates.

To avoid further conflict, Mutant X cut his losses and fled Muir Island aboard Angus MacWhirter's boat before the X-Men arrived in force to confront him. On the Scottish mainland, he transferred his essence into the body of Fergie Duncan, rejuvenating himself in the process and leaving the X-Men none the wiser about his current identity. He had just jumped bodies again from Fergie into a passing policeman when the X-Men Wolverine and Nightcrawler caught up with him. Wolverine deduced Mutant X's identity and a confrontation began between the mutants. As they squared off, Kevin rejected the Mutant X label and started calling himself Proteus after the changing Greek god of myth and the room Moira used to control him as a child. Proteus tried to possess Wolverine's body, but was forced out by the Adamantium in Logan's skeleton. Nonetheless, he quickly incapacitated Nightcrawler and Wolverine by distorting spatial and substantial reality around them. Storm arrived and injured Proteus's host with her lightning, but Proteus grounded her and attempted to claim her form as his own. Moira managed to drive him off by firing sniper rounds at her son through a long-range scope, staying out of his field of vision and the range of his powers. Fearing the metal in Moira's bullets, Proteus fled and continued his trek towards Edinburgh and his father.

Proteus eventually went to Edinburgh, to possess his father, Joseph. After possessing his father, Proteus made a last stand against the X-Men. Joseph MacTaggert's body was destroyed in the battle. Before Proteus could take another host, Colossus (in his metallic form) punched Proteus in his energy form. Due to Proteus's intolerance for metal, he was unable to maintain his energy form. His energy was therefore dispersed across the world, and the X-Men and Moira assumed that he had been killed.

Some time after his death, Moira MacTaggert thought about cloning Kevin, but she was discouraged successfully by Sean Cassidy (Banshee).

Several years later, A.I.M. attempted to recreate Proteus. The organization used a woman named Harness and her mutant son, Piecemeal, to absorb all of the dispersed energy of Proteus. Piecemeal and Harness encountered the New Mutants, but escaped them. As the boy went about absorbing the energy, his body grew too large for his system to handle. Eventually, what was left of Proteus's consciousness and Piecemeal merged as one being after Piecemeal absorbed all the extant Proteus energy.

The combined efforts of the New Warriors, the New Mutants, the Muir Islanders, and the original X-Factor was not enough against this new creature. When the amalgamated being decided that it would not find happiness, it decided to disperse once more, effectively committing "suicide".

Some time later it was  revealed that Moira had recorded Proteus's DNA matrix on a disc which was being sought by Siena Blaze under the Gamesmaster's orders, who in turn was working with a mysterious associate. Siena was  able to locate the disc but before she could evade being caught she had to fight Nightcrawler and Shadowcat. They were able to recover the disc and return it to Moira when Rachel Summers joined the battle. Siena teleported away, vowing revenge. The mysterious associate of Gamesmaster was revealed to be Mr. Sinister who was furious with Siena Blaze that she did not manage to steal the DNA of Moira's son; however, his anger was quelled after Siena revealed she had scratched Rachel Summers.

House of M and Exiles
When the Scarlet Witch altered history and created the House of M reality, she inadvertently released Mutant X on the world again. Just as before, Moira MacTaggert discovered her son Kevin possessed vast mutant powers that were eating away at his body, and tried to cure him of this affliction. In the House of M, however, any attempt to "cure" mutation was a capital offense, and Magneto's Sentinels destroyed Moira's lab on Muir Island, making her a wanted fugitive and setting Kevin loose to kill as he pleased. Mutant X soon became an infamous Scottish serial killer known for the desiccated corpses he left in his wake.

He encounters the Exiles and actually manages to escape the House of M by stealing data from the Panoptichron. Notably, when he leaves his home reality he inhabits bodies of superhumans from "approximation" realities or Exiles members only. He has inhabited the bodies of an unnamed mutant, of Blunderbuss, and of Angel Salvadore in House of M; Mimic and Morph in Exiles; Justice from the New Universe; and the Hulk from the Marvel 2099 universe. None of these bodies lasts for long, with the exception of Angel Salvadore. Other reality manipulators, such as Longshot may be immune to Proteus's manipulations. Mutant X's current body, Morph from Exiles, also does not seem to deteriorate while Proteus inhabits it.

Proteus states that he could not stop thinking about Blink. Whether it was because he still had some of Mimic's memories or because he actually felt something for her is not yet clear. He states he was tired of fighting and that he just wants to talk, but before he can say anything, Longshot shields Blink, allowing her to teleport to safety. It is revealed by Proteus himself that his mind is able to recall all memories and feelings of his previous hosts. Following the death of Mimic, when Proteus transferred into Morph, Blink tricks Proteus into wearing a portable Behavior Modification System (from the Squadron Supreme's world), which she teleported into the crown he was wearing. The device brainwashes him into believing he is actually Morph and leaves him able to recall only Morph's memories prior to his possession. Unaware of his true identity, he begins behaving exactly like Morph and a member of the Exiles, much to the discomfort of the other Exiles. With Proteus trapped and believing he is Morph, he remained an Exile to continue fixing damaged realities. Considering Morph's body does not burn out like other hosts, Morph's consciousness is still active beneath Proteus. Also, Proteus is immune to metal while in Morph's body, since wearing a metal tiara during the "Heroes Reborn" world did not kill him. However, concerns about some discrepancies in "Morph's" behavior forced his teammates to plan regular brainwashings with the same device, and, eventually, put him in stasis whenever his behavior again became abnormal. However, that device was destroyed when Psylocke and Sabretooth fought so intensely that they shook the Crystal Palace, causing a bookcase to fall on Morph's head, shattering the device.

During a confrontation where Proteus reawakened, he found himself lacking in power to defeat the adversary. About to be crushed, Proteus shouted aloud his desire to stay alive. In a vision, he saw a figure, almost identical to his own true energy form, telling him to take its hand, and he would survive. Upon doing so, Proteus found himself full of even greater power, using it to defeat his god-like enemy. Afterwards, it was revealed that this being was the personality and soul of the true Morph, having been in limbo, gaining strength within Proteus and his own body, who had before only been able to speak a few sentences through Proteus's control. Revealing to Proteus that he had the ability to eject him from his body, Morph gave Proteus the chance to work together and share his body and their powers, in order to do more good, something which Morph had discovered Proteus desired deep inside. Proteus accepted, and the two now work in harmony, better than either could be alone. Some time later, though, Proteus and Morph were completely separated by forces beyond their control. The crystalline structure of the Panoptichron reacted to the Exiles' continued presence in its walls by absorbing them into the crystal itself. The Crystal Palace somehow differentiated between Proteus and Morph, absorbing the former into the crystal walls while leaving the latter unscathed.

Necrosha
Some of the Exiles that were trapped in the Crystal Palace have since resurfaced in other stories, indicating that those Exiles were eventually released from the crystal wall unharmed. Linearly speaking, Proteus was eventually restored as dispersed energy on Earth-616 and decided he was not happy being dead anymore, and arranged to bring himself back to life. To accomplish this, he planned to roughly recreate the process previously used by Harness and Piecemeal. When Selene began using the Technarch transmode virus to resurrect dead mutants, Proteus took advantage of her work by affixing a small portion of his energy signature, and therefore his consciousness, to the precognitive Destiny as she was resurrected. (This worked because Destiny died on Muir Island, a place with one of the largest concentrations of residual Proteus energy.) Although the quantum of Proteus energy involved was not enough to truly "possess" Destiny as he had done in the past, Proteus was able to influence Destiny's perceptions so that she saw a future of his design, and acted accordingly.

When Destiny tried telepathically contacting her foster-daughter Rogue, she instead found Blindfold and passed on her vision (and unwittingly a portion of Proteus energy). Now being influenced by Proteus as well, Blindfold confirmed Destiny's obscured vision that a threat was rising on Muir Island, and the X-Men needed to stop it. Trusting their premonitions, Cyclops dispatched Blindfold with a squad of X-Men for Muir. Once they arrived, Proteus was able to use Blindfold like a "psychic magnet", soaking up more and more Proteus energy from his familiar surroundings until she reached critical mass, and enough Proteus energy was consolidated in one place to truly resurrect Kevin MacTaggert, letting him fully possess Blindfold. Destiny had recognized her error after passing the energy on the Blindfold, but arrived too late to stop Proteus's ascension.

Once he was restored, Proteus turned on the X-Men, particularly his murderer Colossus who was among the team, and Magneto whose power over Proteus's weakness, metal, made him the most dangerous. Worse still, Proteus's experience reconstituting himself taught him how to split his energy among multiple bodies, possessing several X-Men simultaneously as he added Nightcrawler, Husk, Trance and Psylocke to his existing hosts Blindfold and Destiny. Rogue struck back at Proteus, stealing Psylocke's psi-knife to disrupt his control of his hosts one by one. As Rogue's stolen power wore off, Magneto magnetically launched himself and "Blindfold" into low orbit. Although Proteus managed to redirect them back to Earth, the distraction gave Magneto the time he needed to electromagnetically identify Proteus's energy wavelength, and disrupt it. With Proteus back in the same position he was in when he initiated his own resurrection hours earlier, Psylocke questioned how they knew he would not return one day. Magneto ominously replied that, in fact, they should know that he would return.

Agent X
Some of Proteus's energy was found drifting in the Astral Plane by the Shadow King, who used it to become his new source of power, in an endless battle between him and Xavier, who had been forced to partake in this following his death at the hands of Cyclops. In the battle's final moments, Shadow King spread Proteus as a psychic infection on London. With the help of his X-Men, Xavier (now inhabiting Fantomex's body and calling himself X), defeated the Shadow King, and unaware of the psychic infection nature, he was eventually able to gather it in the shape of a green sun, reconstituting in the process Proteus. Knowing that Proteus is vulnerable to metal, Old Man Logan wants to face him with Archangel, but X wants to reason with him first and asks for Psylocke's help to enter Proteus's mind together. Proteus feels his mind being forced into and allows X and Psylocke to enter his mental landscape. X and Betsy find themselves near a beautiful castle where they are welcomed by the young Kevin McTaggert. Kevin believes atonement and change are possible and strongly believes he was only ten years old at the time Colossus killed him back at Muir Island (although it was established that Kevin was actually 19 or 20 years old at the time). He came back a few times after that, but the X-Men were always there to kill him just because he dared to see the world after years off imprisonment. When the Shadow King grabbed a hold of his psyche, he spent ten thousand years on the Astral Plane reflecting on what he had done to all the poor people he had possessed back then. Kevin shows Betsy an image of her original body dressed in the pink uniform and asks her if she is still the same person she was when she started her journey. Kevin argues that the X-Men want to kill him again just because he did something bad in the past. Proteus says if they leave him alone, he will leave them alone as well. X does not want to risk, and attacks Kevin instead. In retaliation, Proteus merges the physical bodies of X and Psylocke and sends them back to London. After the merger is undone and X and Psylocke are rescued by their teammates, X reveals that Proteus is planning to bring the Astral Plane into the real world to make it function like the psionic realm. Kevin traveled to the Scottish village of Fetters Hill, in order to carry out his experiment and granted the citizens of the town the ability to make real whatever they wished. As the X-Men confronted Proteus again, the village had already fallen into chaos, and it became a gestalt of the villagers' mindscapes. During the fight Proteus made Fetters Hill erupt, launching seeds into many cities of the world with the objective to transform them as well. The X-Men were eventually able, after a fieriest battle, to disrupt Proteus's energies and dispersed his physical structure while the damage he caused to reality was reversed by Psylocke and X.

House of X
Proteus is shown to be an inhabitant of Krakoa where he is inhabiting a Professor X husk. He is paired up with Elixir, Hope Summer, Goldballs, and Tempus as The Five where they use their talents to revive the dead mutants.

Piecemeal

Piecemeal (Gilbert Benson) is a fictional mutant character in the Marvel Universe. His first appearance was in New Mutants Annual #7.

Young Gilbert Benson was a mutant with the ability to absorb different energy frequencies and store them within his body. His mother, the armored mutant mercenary known as Harness who had been employed by Advanced Idea Mechanics, cruelly exploited this ability and forced Gilbert, whom she dubbed Piecemeal, to travel across the world with her to absorb the dispersed energy of Proteus, the deceased reality-warping son of geneticist Moira MacTaggert.

Absorbing the energy, Piecemeal grew larger and larger until he looked like a 700-pound monstrosity. The mutant team X-Force, alongside the New Warriors and a makeshift group of Muir Island-based X-Men allies, did their best to help siphon off the energy, but they failed. Finally, Gilbert's body exploded, and in that instant his mind combined with that of the reformed Proteus to form a new amalgamated being. The new entity set about warping reality all over Scotland.

The amalgamated Proteus/Piecemeal also captured their mothers and held them hostage as the pre-government-sponsored X-Factor team arrived. Finally, X-Factor convinced the boys to disperse their energies, consigning them both to oblivion.

Powers and abilities
Proteus is an omega-level mutant that possesses a vast psionic ability to manipulate and alter reality. He exists in a state of pure psionic energy and can take possession of human bodies; however, the bodies of most beings burn out within hours or a few days, although a few have been known to last longer. Proteus can leave a body before it is destroyed, but he usually does not. No possessed person has been shown able to resist or break free of Proteus's domination. Proteus has access to all the memories of his host while he possesses them and after he has left the body. Proteus has occasionally exhibited some telepathy, perfect recall, and the ability to mentally download computer information.

Only living beings with metal in their bodies appear to be immune to the possession, since metal is apparently the only weakness of Proteus. In fact, contact with enough metal in this form can disrupt Proteus's energy and destroy his consciousness, dispersing it, which rendered Wolverine immune to his possession due to his metal skeleton and allowed Colossus to disrupt him in the X-Men's first confrontation with him.

His reality manipulation powers allow him to transmute matter and bend the laws of physics according to his imagination within a certain range. Using this power he can easily turn a building into liquid, turn a vehicle into bees that attack at his mental command, transform energy into matter, manipulate weather, or strip a person of their mutant powers. He often reverses local gravity, opens fissures in the earth, and stretches people painfully into liquid shapes (they return to normal when he no longer concentrates on manipulating their bodies). Use of this ability tends to speed up the rate at which his body will burn out. Proteus's reality warping ability is contingent upon line of sight: if he shifts his sight to another object and warps it, the previous object he was warping will return to normal.

Because Proteus is a being made of energy, he is virtually immortal since his consciousness can reform after such a disruption, but he has not shown the ability to do so without assistance. Proteus has at times exhibited the ability to transport himself inter-dimensionally, but it is not known whether he always could do this, or his resurrection by the Scarlet Witch enhanced his powers, or if he needed to use a connection to the Panoptichron in order to accomplish this. After his revival through Destiny during the events of Necrosha, Proteus is shown to be able, to his surprise, to possess multiple individuals simultaneously.

Other versions

Star Trek/X-Men crossover
In the Star Trek/X-Men crossover, the spirit of Proteus crosses over to the universe of Star Trek because of a rift created by classic Star Trek antagonist Gary Mitchell (who also had reality warping powers). Proteus is able to reanimate and inhabit Mitchell's corpse, which does not deteriorate like other hosts. While chasing Deathbird, the X-Men end up teaming up with the crew of the USS Enterprise to stop Proteus, who forms an alliance with Deathbird to escape the planet.

At one point, Proteus compares Mitchell's fate (as seen in the Star Trek TV series episode "Where No Man Has Gone Before") to the kind of anti-mutant prejudice that the X-Men are fighting.

Ultimate Marvel
In the Ultimate Marvel universe, Proteus is named David Xavier and is the son of Moira MacTaggert and her ex-husband Professor X (Charles Xavier). Like in the mainstream version, he escapes his mother's keep on Muir Island, seeking his father in order to kill him. Proteus kills thousands of people all across the world in an attempt to discredit the X-Men, where he also murders Psylocke's partner Dai Thomas, agent of S.T.R.I.K.E. Before David can finish his deadly vendetta, he is found to be inside Betsy, traveling to Germany where Betsy fought David for control. After Xavier refused to kill David, Colossus kills them both by crushing them inside a car.

In other media

Proteus appeared in the two-part animated X-Men series episode "Proteus", voiced by Stuart Stone. Kevin MacTaggert had his reality warping and possession powers, but he also had the ability to change himself back into his human form as well, a power he did not have in the comics. Also, when he took over people's bodies, it did not kill them like it did in the comics, it only weakened them. Proteus himself was somewhat humanized and much less evil; he was a violent, unstable, 17-year-old adolescent with a childlike mentality and little grasp on reality (Moira kept him practically locked in her center for years), and at a certain moment he even saved a young man from being beaten up by a gang of bullies. Kevin/Proteus took off in search for his father; not knowing the truth and craving for his father's love, he blamed his mother Moira for not giving his father a chance. He then attacked Professor X, Rogue, Moira, Wolverine, and Beast, defeating them and making Wolverine experience death, which causes Logan a great deal of psychological damage. Moira tells Professor X that Proteus's father, Joseph, did not want him because he was a mutant. Professor X and the X-Men confront Joseph himself, but he refuses to listen and is only bothered about people finding out he is Kevin's father because he is a mutant. Rogue is set to protect Joseph, and she hears his speech about loving children, thus triggering her to remember her past of when her father rejected her due to her own status as a mutant. Kevin arrives at the hall and attacks Rogue and Beast as Joseph leaves. Professor X tries to reason with Proteus and he blames the Professor for keeping Joseph away from him. Wolverine arrives in time to save Professor X and Beast. Professor X tries to contact Proteus mentally and tells him he can help him, but Proteus insists on seeing his father. Moira says they've tried to reason with him enough and tells them she needs to do something about it now. Kevin arrives at another speech of Joseph's, saying that he wants Joseph to love him but Joseph says that he's a trick and trying to ruin him. Joseph tells him to leave and Kevin gets so mad that he loses control. Professor X manages to stop him by using his psychic powers, calming Kevin down; he returns to his normal shape and gets a hug from Moira. Joseph arrives, apologizes to Kevin, and the two reconcile.

Bibliography

List of titles
 Uncanny X-Men #125–128
 Classic X-Men #32
 Classic X-Men #36
 Uncanny X-Men Annual #15
 New Mutants Annual #7
 X-Factor Annual #6
 New Warriors Annual #1
 Star Trek/X-Men
 Exiles #69–82
 X-Men Legacy #232–233

References

Characters created by Chris Claremont
Characters created by John Byrne (comics)
Comics characters introduced in 1979
Fictional characters who can manipulate reality
Fictional characters with elemental transmutation abilities
Fictional characters with gravity abilities
Fictional characters with spirit possession or body swapping abilities
Fictional characters with weather abilities
Fictional mass murderers
Fictional Scottish people
Fictional serial killers
Marvel Comics characters who have mental powers
Marvel Comics male supervillains
Marvel Comics mutants
Marvel Comics telepaths
X-Men supporting characters